Friederike (Fredi) Elly Luise Otto (born 29 August 1982) is a climatologist who as of December 2021 works as a Senior Lecturer at the Grantham Institute for Climate Change and the Environment at Imperial College London. Previously she was Associate Director of the Environmental Change Institute (ECI) at the University of Oxford. Her research focuses on answering the question whether and to what extent extreme weather conditions change as a result of external climate drivers. A highly recognized expert in the field of attribution research, she examines the extent to which human-caused climate change as well as vulnerability and exposure are responsible for events such heat waves, droughts and floods. Together with climate scientist Geert Jan van Oldenborgh she founded the international project World Weather Attribution which she still leads.
 In 2021, she was included in the Time 100, Times annual list of the 100 most influential people in the world. She was also one of ten scientists who had had important roles in scientific developments in 2021 highlighted in the scientific journal Nature.

Biography 
Born in Kiel, Germany, in 1982, Friederike Elly Luise Otto graduated in physics from the University of Potsdam before earning a PhD in philosophy of science from the Free University of Berlin in 2012. She is a British citizen and lives in London, following 10 years at Oxford University where she began to investigate the impact of weather events on climate change. In her role as co-leader of World Weather Attribution, she has been able to influence the international development of climate change strategies. In connection with Hurricane Harvey in 2017, she concluded that it caused between 12% and 22% of additional rainfall to fall on Houston. She has also maintained that there is little doubt Hurricane Laura in 2020 was the result of climate change effects. She believes that such attribution reports will help to persuade governments to adopt measures aimed at creating more carbon-neutral communities.

Otto's 2019 book Wütendes Wetter, published in English as Angry Weather, became a best seller and received positive reviews. The book details efforts to show which extreme weather events have been made more likely or more severe due to climate change.

The approach to event attribution she codeveloped has become routine within the climate community. It was assessed as mature in the 2021 IPCC Sixth Assessment Report, in contrast to the 2013 IPCC Fifth Assessment Report, in which it was concluded that the scientific methods to attribute individual extreme events to climate change were not yet fit-for-purpose. Otto works together with lawyers in lawsuit that seek compensation for victims of extreme events from companies and governments with historical responsibility for climate change.

In 2021, she was included in the Time 100, Times annual list of the 100 most influential people in the world. She was also one of ten scientists who had had important roles in scientific developments in 2021 highlighted in the scientific journal Nature.

Publications 

 Angry weather – In search of the culprits for heatwaves, floods and storms. Ullstein Berlin, 2019.  
Angry Weather: Heat Waves, Floods, Storms, and the New Science of Climate Change. English Edition. Greystone Books, 2019.

References

External links 

Friederike Otto explains The Attribution Question on YouTube
Interview with Friederike Otto , Times Higher Education (THE)

1982 births
Living people
Scientists from Kiel
German climatologists
Women climatologists
University of Potsdam alumni
Free University of Berlin alumni
Academics of the University of Oxford
21st-century German women scientists
21st-century German scientists
Climate change assessment and attribution